Panian is one of the 44 union councils, administrative subdivisions, of Haripur District in the Khyber Pakhtunkhwa province of Pakistan.

Villages and areas in UC Panian
Kangra Colony
 Kangra Village
 Ganaya
 Todo
 Abdullahpur/Mohra
 Paharo

References 

Union councils of Haripur District